Listeria riparia is a species of bacteria. It is a Gram-positive, facultatively anaerobic, non-motile, non-spore-forming bacillus. It is non-pathongenic. Its name refers to the riparian zone, and its discovery was first published in 2014.

Listeria riparia "(c)an be differentiated from other non-motile species of the genus Listeria by a combination of α-mannosidase activity and the ability to acidify L-rhamnose, D-galactose and L-arabinose."

References

External links
Type strain of Listeria riparia at BacDive -  the Bacterial Diversity Metadatabase

riparia
Bacteria described in 2014